Crich is a village in Derbyshire, England.

Crich may also refer to:
Crich Tramway Village, trading name of National Tramway Museum at Crich
Crich-El-Oued, village in Tunisia

People with the name
Crichy Crich, musician featuring on 2018 single by Orgy
D. Crich, chemist after whom Crich beta-mannosylation is named
Gerard Crich (fictional), character in D H Lawrence's Women in Love